The Deer Park Mosque is a mosque located in the Melbourne north-western suburb of Deer Park, in Victoria, Australia. The mosque is supervised by the Australian Islamic Society of Bosnia and Herzegovina Inc.

History 
The Deer Park Mosque was built in 1993 as the religious focal point for the Bosnian community in Melbourne.

The Deer Park Mosque is one of the largest mosques in Australia.

See also

Islam in Australia
List of mosques in Oceania

Mosques in Melbourne
Mosques completed in 1993
1993 establishments in Australia
Bosniak diaspora
Buildings and structures in the City of Brimbank